The Robert Schumann International Competition for Pianists and Singers was constituted in 1956 in East Berlin within the framework of the commemorations on the 100th anniversary of Robert Schumann's death. A second edition was organized on the occasion of the 150th anniversary of the composer's birth, and three years later a third edition was arranged in Zwickau, his birthplace. The competition, a member of the World Federation of International Music Competitions, has taken place in Zwickau every 3 or 4 years since.

Prize winners

Piano
{| class="wikitable"
|+ Piano
! Year
|-
!1956 !! 1st prize !! 2nd prize !! 3rd prize (ex-a.)
|-
||  ||  Annerose Schmidt ||   Irina Sijalova ||  Lidia Grychtołówna
|-
|| || || ||  Mikhail Voskresensky
|-
|| || || || 
|-
!1960 !! No piano category !! No piano category !! No piano category
|-
|| || || || 
|-
!1963 !! 1st prize !! 2nd prize (ex-a.) !! 3rd prize
|-
||  ||  Nelly Akopyan ||  Rutka Carakcieva ||  Aniko Szegedi
|-
|| || ||  Peter Rösel || 
|-
!1966 !! 1st prize !! 2nd prize !! 3rd prize (ex-a.)
|-
|| ||  Eliso Virsaladze ||  Svetlana Navasardyan ||  Raina Padareva
|-
|| || || ||  Evgenia Sachareva
|-
!1969 !! 1st prize !! 2nd prize !! 3rd prize
|-
|| ||  Dezső Ránki ||  Tatyana Ryumina ||  Okitaka Uehara
|-
!1974 !! 1st prize !! 2nd prize !! 3rd prize
|-
|| ||  Pavel Egorov ||  Dina Joffe ||  Petru Grossmann
|-
!1977 !! 1st prize !! 2nd prize !! 3rd prize
|-
|| ||  Emma Tahmizian ||  Dana Borşan ||  Christoph Taubert
|-
!1981 !! 1st prize !! 2nd prize !! 3rd prize (ex-a.)
|-
|| ||  Yves Henry ||  Susanne Grützmann ||  Kalle Randalu
|-
|| || || ||  Balázs Szokolay
|-
!1985 !! 1st prize !! 2nd prize !! 3rd prize
|-
|| ||  Tamriko Siprashvili ||  Zuzana Paulechová ||  Mzija Gogashvili
|-
!1989 !! 1st prize !! 2nd prize !! 3rd prize
|-
|| ||  Éric Le Sage ||  Sachiko Yonekawa ||  Alexander Melnikov
|-
!1993 !! 1st prize !! 2nd prize !! 3rd prize
|-
|| ||  Temirzhan Yerzhanov ||  Eiji Shigaki ||  Corrado Rollero
|-
!1996 !! 1st prize !! 2nd prize !! 3rd prize (ex-a.)
|-
|| ||  Mikhail Mordvinov ||   Dana Ciocarlie ||  Lyubov Gegechkori
|-
|| || || ||  Christian Seibert
|-
!2000 !! 1st prize !! 2nd prize !! 3rd prize
|-
|| ||  Kiai Nara ||  Ulugbek Palvanov ||  Andrea Rebaudengo
|-
!2004 !! 1st prize !! 2nd prize !! 3rd prize
|-
|| ||  Akiko Yamamoto ||  Nicolas Bringuier ||   Soojin Ahn
|-
!2008 !! 1st prize !! 2nd prize !! 3rd prize
|-
|| ||  Mizuka Kano ||  Akiko Nikami ||  Da Sol Kim
|-
!2012 !! 1st prize !! 2nd prize !! 3rd prize
|-
|| ||  Aljoša Jurinić ||  Florian Noack ||  Luca Buratto
|-
!2016 !! 1st prize !! 2nd prize !! 3rd prize
|-
|| || ||  Tomoyo Umemura ||  Tiffany Poon
|-
|| || ||  Cheng Zhang ||  Maiko Ami
|-
|}

Voice
{| class="wikitable"
|+ Voice
! Year
|-
!1956 !! 1st prize (ex-a.) !! 2nd prize (ex-a.) !! 3rd prize 
|-
||  ||  Kira Isotova ||  Sigrid Kehl ||  Dan Iordăchescu
|-
|| ||  Aleksander Vedernikov ||  Jiří Bar || 
|-
!1960 !! 1st prize !! 2nd prize (ex-a.) !! 3rd prize (ex-a.) 
|-
||  ||  Vitali Gromadski ||  Wolfgang Hellmich ||  Sylvia Geszty
|-
|| || ||  Roman Horák ||  Violanta Sirotinina
|-
!1963 !! 1st prize !! 2nd prize !! 3rd prize  
|-
||  ||  Karl Heinz Stryczek ||  Evgeni Isakov ||  Friederike Apelt
|-
!1966 !! 1st prize !! 2nd prize !! 3rd prize  
|-
||  ||  Ionel Pantea ||  Julia Albonico ||  Jürgen Hartfiel
|-
!1969 !! 1st prize !! 2nd prize !! 3rd prize
|-
|| Ladies ||  Heidi Berthold-Riess ||  Rosemarie Lang ||  Georgina Orlovschi
|-
|| Gentlemen ||  Ruben Lisician ||  Peter Tschaplik ||  Siegfried Lorenz
|-
!1974 !! 1st prize !! 2nd prize !! 3rd prize
|-
|| Ladies ||  Mitsuko Shirai ||  Andrea Ihle ||  Violetta Madjarova
|-
|| Gentlemen ||  Lászlo Polgár ||  Sergej Lejferkus ||  Mihai Zamfir
|-
!1977 !! 1st prize !! 2nd prize !! 3rd prize
|-
|| Ladies ||  Edith Wiens ||  Mary Ann Hart ||  Jana Mrázová
|-
|| Gentlemen ||  Boris Mareskin ||  Alibek Dnisev ||  Christoph Rösel
|-
!1981 !! 1st prize !! 2nd prize !! 3rd prize
|-
|| Ladies || not awarded ||  Constanza Mestes ||  Györgyi Benza (Ex aequo)
|-
|| || || ||  Nadja Cvetkova (Ex aequo)
|-
|| Gentlemen ||  Jürgen Kurth ||  Andreas Scheibner ||  Matthias Weichert
|-
!1985 !! 1st prize !! 2nd prize !! 3rd prize
|-
|| Ladies || not awarded ||  Cornelia Wosnitza ||  Kirsten Bertkau
|-
|| Gentlemen ||  Karsten Mewes ||  Egbert Junghanns ||  Thomas Mäthger
|-
!1989 !! 1st prize !! 2nd prize !! 3rd prize
|-
|| Ladies || not awarded ||  Angela Liebold (Ex aequo) ||  Britta Schwarz 
|-
|| || ||  Svetlana Sumaceva (Ex aequo) ||
|-
|| Gentlemen ||  Frank Schiller ||  Matthias Goerne ||  Torsten Frisch
|-
!1993 !! 1st prize !! 2nd prize !! 3rd prize
|-
|| Ladies || not awarded ||  Asako Motojima ||  Barbara Hölzl (Ex aequo)
|-
|| || || ||  Fumiko Hatayama (Ex aequo)
|-
|| Gentlemen ||  Locky Chung ||  Stefan Geyer ||  Raimond Spogis
|-
!1996 !! 1st prize !! 2nd prize !! 3rd prize
|-
|| Ladies ||  Risako Kurosawa ||  Maria-Riccarda Schmid ||  Bodil Arnesen
|-
|| Gentlemen ||  Henryk Böhm ||  Hideki Kadoya ||  Marius Budoin
|-
!2000 !! 1st prize !! 2nd prize !! 3rd prize
|-
|| Ladies ||  Annette Dasch ||  Christa Mayer ||  Measha Brueggergosman
|-
|| Gentlemen || not awarded ||  Klemens Geyrhofer ||  Kyu-Hee Cho
|-
!2004 !! 1st prize !! 2nd prize !! 3rd prize
|-
|| Ladies || not awarded ||  Stefanie Irányi (Ex aequo) ||  Julia Amos
|-
|| || ||  Lydia Teuscher (Ex aequo) ||
|-
|| Gentlemen ||  Colin Balzer ||  Daniel Wolfgang Johannsen ||  Peter McGillivray
|-
!2008 !! 1st prize !! 2nd prize !! 3rd prize
|-
|| Ladies ||  Anne-Theresa Albrecht ||   Carolina Ullrich ||  Julia Hajnóczy (Ex aequo)
|-
|| || || ||  Sophie Harmsen (Ex aequo) 
|-
|| Gentlemen || ||  Christoph Pohl (Ex aequo) ||  Jesse Blumberg
|-
|| || ||  Tomasz Wija (Ex aequo) ||
|-
!2012 !! 1st prize !! 2nd prize !! 3rd prize
|-
|| Ladies ||  Anna Lucia Richter ||  Fatma Said ||  Simone Easthope (Ex aequo)
|-
|| || || ||  Annika Boos (Ex aequo) 
|-
|| Gentlemen ||  Mauro Peter ||  Georg Gädker (Ex aequo) || not awarded
|-
|| || ||  Sebastian Wartig (Ex aequo) ||
|-
!2016 !! 1st prize !! 2nd prize !! 3rd prize
|-
|| Ladies ||  Henriette Gödde ||  Hiltrud Kuhlmann ||  Hagar Sharvit
|-
|| Gentlemen ||  André Baleiro ||  Jean-Christophe Fillol ||  Jonathan Michie
|-
|}

String quartet
{| class="wikitable"
|+ String Quartet
! Year
|-
!1960 !! 1st prize !! 2nd prize !! 3rd prize 
|-
||  ||  Jan-Evert-Andersson-Quartett ||  Peter-Komlós-Quartett ||  Christian-Lucaß-Quartett
|-
|}

References

Singing competitions
Zwickau
Piano competitions
Music competitions in Germany
Recurring events established in 1956
1956 establishments in East Germany